Gondogoro Glacier or Gondoghoro Glacier is glacier near Concordia in Gilgit-Baltistan, Pakistan. It serves as an alternative means to reach Concordia; the confluence of Baltoro Glacier and Godwin-Austen Glacier.

See also
Gondogoro Pass
List of mountains in Pakistan
List of highest mountains
List of glaciers

External links
 Northern Pakistan detailed placemarks in Google Earth 

Glaciers of Gilgit-Baltistan